Civic Center, Karachi is the civic center which is the headquarters for the Government of Karachi and the office for the Mayor of Karachi is located here. Karachi Development Authority, Sindh Building Control Authority offices are also headquartered here. It is situated near Hasan Square, Gulshan-e-Iqbal on the main University Road.

Civic Center also houses Command and Control center for the Karachi police

History
Civic Center, Karachi building was founded on 15 November 1979.

References

See also 
 Mayor of Karachi
 Government of Karachi
 Karachi Development Authority
 Karachi Expo Center

Government of Karachi
1979 establishments in Pakistan